Wamanripa (local name for Senecio or a species of it, also applied for Laccopetalum giganteum, also spelled Huamanripa) is mountain in the Cordillera Central in the Andes of Peru which reaches a height of approximately . It is located in the Lima Region, Yauyos Province, Huancaya District.

References 

Mountains of Lima Region
Mountains of Peru